Rhabdouraea bentzi is an extinct species of leptostracan crustacean which lived during the Permian, which is placed in its own genus, Rhabdouraea, and family, Rhabdouraeidae.

References

Leptostraca
Prehistoric Malacostraca
Prehistoric crustacean genera
Permian crustaceans
Monotypic arthropod genera
Fossils of Germany